Lin Chao-Huang (born August 17, 1969) is a Taiwanese baseball player who competed in the 1992 Summer Olympics.

He was part of the Chinese Taipei baseball team which won the silver medal. He is a right-handed pitcher.

External links
profile

1969 births
Living people
Baseball players at the 1992 Summer Olympics
Olympic baseball players of Taiwan
Olympic silver medalists for Taiwan
Baseball players from Taipei
Olympic medalists in baseball
Baseball players at the 1990 Asian Games
Medalists at the 1992 Summer Olympics
Asian Games competitors for Chinese Taipei